Muhammad Ilyas Ghuman is a Pakistani Deobandi cleric, Islamic preacher, Ilm al-Kalām expert (Mutakallim e islam), religious philosopher, Sufi (he is a discipline of Peer Aziz ur Rehman Hazarvi), Debater, Theologian, and columnist who is the head of Markaz Ahle Sunnat Wal Jamaat in Sargodha.

Early life and career
Ghuman was born on 12 April 1969 in Sargodha District. He is a graduate of the Jamia Binoria.

In 2005, he was arrested for alleged involvement in the murder of Sargodha Division Commissioner Syed Tajamul Abbas. In 2006, he was again arrested related to the murder of Shia cleric Bashir Husain Bukhari.

In 2013, he was arrested by the police when he was touring Southern Punjab. In August 2015, he was freed from house arrest.

In August 2018, he published a book named Mera Pakistan.

Books
Some of his books include:<ref>Profile on WorldCat'</ref>
 Firqah-yi Ahl-i ḥadīs̲ Pāk va Hind kā taḥqīqī jāʼizah, 2010, 374 p. Criticism of the Ahl-e Hadith.
 Firqah-yi Barailviyat Pāk va Hind kā taḥqīqī jāʼizah, 2012, 617 p. Criticism of the Barelvis.
 Maẓāmīn-i mutakallim-i Islām, 2012, multiple volumes. On miscellaneous issues of Islam; Islamic doctrines, collected articles published in various Urdu magazines.
 Majālis-i mutakallim-i Islām, 2013, 2 volumes. Sermons.
 Firqah-i Saifiyah kā taḥqīqī jāʼizah, 2013, 252 p. Criticism of Akhundzada Saif-ur-Rahman Mubarak (1925-2010), a Barelvi scholar.
 K̲h̲ut̤bāt-i mutakallim-i Islām, 2013, 3 volumes. Sermons.
 Firqah-i Jamāʻatulmuslimīn kā taḥqīqī jāʼizah, 2013, 166 p. Critical study on the belief of Jamāʻatulmuslimīn, Pakistan; a Muslim sect derived from Ahl-i Hadīth.
 Mavāʻiz̤-i mutakkalim-i Islām, 2 volumes, 2013. Islamic sermons on religious life of Muslim women.
 Jihād fī sabīlilláh aur iʻtirāẓāt kā ʻilmī jāʼizah, 2014, 304 p. On jihad.
 Jī hān̲ Fiqah-i Ḥanafī Qurān va Ḥadīs̲ kā nacoṛ hai, 2014, 286 p. In defense of Hanafites with special reference to their views on various aspects of Islamic law.
 Kanzulīmān kā taḥqīqī jāʼizah'', 2014, 242 p. Criticism of Kanzul Iman by Ahmed Raza Khan Barelvi.

References

Living people
1969 births
Pakistani Islamists
Pakistani prisoners and detainees
Pakistani columnists
Deobandis
People from Sargodha District
Pakistani Sunni Muslim scholars of Islam
Pakistani religious writers
Muslim missionaries
Pakistani Islamic religious leaders
Jamia Binoria alumni